Natural gas in Israel is a primary energy source in Israel, mainly utilized for electricity production and to lesser degree in industry. Israel began producing natural gas from its own offshore gas fields in 2004. Between 2005 and 2012, Israel had imported gas from Egypt via the al-Arish-Ashkelon pipeline, which was terminated due to Egyptian Crisis of 2011-14. As of 2017, Israel produced over 9 billion cubic meters (bcm) of natural gas a year. Israel had 199 billion cubic meters (cu m) of proven reserves of natural gas as of the start of 2016. In early 2017, Israel began exporting natural gas to the Kingdom of Jordan.

History

Historically, Israel relied on external imports for meeting most of its energy needs, spending an amount equivalent to over 5% of its GDP per year in 2009 on imports of energy products. The transportation sector relies mainly on gasoline and diesel fuel, while the majority of electricity production is generated using imported coal. As of 2013, Israel was importing about 100 million barrels of oil per year. The country possesses negligible reserves of crude oil but does have abundant domestic natural gas resources which were discovered in large quantities starting in 2009, after many decades of previously unsuccessful exploration.

Until the early 2000s, natural gas use in Israel was minimal. In the late 1990s, the government of Israel decided to encourage the usage of natural gas because of environmental, cost, and resource diversification reasons. At the time however, there were no domestic sources of natural gas and the expectation was that gas would be supplied from overseas in the form of LNG and by a future pipeline from Egypt (which eventually became the Arish–Ashkelon pipeline). Plans were made for the Israel Electric Corporation to construct several gas-driven power plants, for erecting a national gas distribution grid, and for an LNG import terminal. Soon thereafter, gas began to be located within Israeli territory, first in modest amounts and a decade later in very large quantities located in deep water off the Israeli coastline.

Discoveries in the 2000s

In 2000, a modest discovery was made when a 33-billion-cubic-metre (BCM), or 1,200-billion-cubic-foot, natural-gas field was located offshore Ashkelon, with commercial production starting in 2004.  however, this field is nearly depleted—earlier than expected due to increased pumping to partially compensate for the loss of imported Egyptian gas in the wake of unrest associated with the fall of the Mubarak regime in 2011. Furthermore, results of 3D seismic surveys and test drilling conducted since 2010 have confirmed that an estimated 621 BCM natural-gas deposit exists in a large underwater geological formation nearby the large gas field already discovered in 2009. The US Energy Information Administration listed Israel as having 6.2 trillion cubic feet of proved reserves as of 1 January 2015.

The discoveries of natural gas confirmed that the Levant basin of the Eastern Mediterranean contains significant quantities of natural gas. Consequently, additional exploration for gas off Israel's coastline is continuing. In early 2012 the Israeli cabinet announced plans to set up a sovereign wealth fund (called "the Israeli Citizens' Fund") that would allocate part of the royalties from energy exploration to education, defense and overseas investments.

The Tamar field began commercial production on 30 March 2013 after four years of extensive development works. The supply of gas from Tamar is expected to provide a boost to the Israeli economy, which has suffered losses of more than NIS20 billion between 2011 and 2013 resulting from the disruption of gas supplies from neighboring Egypt (and which are not expected to resume due to Egypt's decision to indefinitely suspend its gas supply agreement to Israel). As a result, Israel, as well as its other neighbor Jordan, which also suffered from disruption of gas deliveries from Egypt, had to resort to importing significantly more expensive and polluting liquid heavy fuels as substitute sources of energy. The ensuing energy crisis in Israel was lifted once the Tamar field came online in 2013, while Jordan committed to a US$10 billion, 15-year gas supply deal totaling 45 BCM from the Israeli Leviathan field, which came online in late 2019. The agreement is estimated to save Jordan US$600 million per year in energy costs.

In 2018, the owners of the Tamar and Leviathan fields announced that they are negotiating an agreement with a consortium of Egyptian firms, subject to regulatory approval in both countries, for the supply of up to 64 BCM of gas over 10 years valued at up to US$15 billion. Although Egypt has been making strides in developing new gas fields in recent years to help it meet rising domestic demand, it also has idle LNG exporting capacity and the deal has the potential to help make it an important regional gas export hub.

In late October 2022, Energean started gas production from the Karish field. In late November 2022 Energean announced a new commercial natural gas discovery of 13 billion cubic meters off the shore of Israel as a result of its exploratory drilling well dubbed Zeus.

Power stations
List of Natural gas-fired power stations in Israel:
 Dalia Power Station
 Dorad Power Station
 Eshkol Power Station
 Mishor Rotem Power Station
 Reading Power Station

See also
 Energy in Israel
 Energy Triangle
 Economy of Israel
 Arab Gas Pipeline

References

 
Economy of Israel
Energy in Israel